Henry Crosby Allen (May 13, 1872, Paterson, New Jersey – March 7, 1942, Mystic, Connecticut) was an American Republican Party politician who represented New Jersey's 6th congressional district in the United States House of Representatives from 1905 to 1907.

Early life and education
Martin was born in Paterson, New Jersey on May 13, 1872. He attended private and public schools in his native city, and graduated from St Paul's School in Garden City, New York in 1889, from Yale University in 1893, and from the New York Law School in 1895. He was admitted to the bar in 1895 and commenced practice in Paterson.

Congress
Martin was elected as a Republican to the Fifty-ninth Congress, serving in office from March 4, 1905 – March 3, 1907, but was not a candidate for renomination in 1906.

Post-Congress
After leaving Congress, he resumed the practice of law in Paterson, and served as the postmaster of Paterson from 1926-1935. He died in Mystic, Connecticut on March 7, 1942, while visiting his daughter.

He was interred in Cedar Lawn Cemetery in Paterson.

External links

Henry Crosby Allen at The Political Graveyard

1872 births
1942 deaths
Politicians from Paterson, New Jersey
Republican Party members of the United States House of Representatives from New Jersey
New Jersey lawyers
20th-century American politicians
Yale University alumni
New York Law School alumni